Cornish is a census-designated place (CDP) and the primary village in the town of Cornish, York County, Maine, United States. It is on the northern border of York County, on the south side of the Ossipee River where it joins the Saco. To the north, across the Ossipee, is the town of Hiram in Oxford County, and to the east, across the Saco, is the town of Baldwin in Cumberland County.

Maine State Route 25 passes through Cornish, leading southeast  to Gorham and west  to Center Ossipee, New Hampshire. State Route 5 leads south-southeast from Cornish  to the city of Saco and north-northwest  to Fryeburg. 

Cornish was first listed as a CDP prior to the 2020 census.

Demographics

References 

Census-designated places in York County, Maine
Census-designated places in Maine